Chinonso Arubayi is a Nigerian film and television actress, television presenter, film and television producer and model. She is best known for her roles in My Flatmates, Rumour Has It and her film production debut, I Am Nazzy alongside IK Ogbonna and  Jidekene Achufusi. She is also known for her time hosting the Urban Kitchen Show.

Early life
Chinonso was born in Warri, a town in Delta state, in southern Nigeria. She grew in up in Lagos, and is of Igbo heritage, from Awka, in Anambra state, where she graduated with a degree in Mass communication from Nnamdi Azikiwe University. While at the university, she was a presenter on the campus radio station. In 2005, Chinonso won the Miss Teen Nigeria title.

Career
Chinonso began her acting career as a day player on M-Net television series,  The Johnsons  in 2014. She then began writing and producing for Consolidated Media Associates, owners of Sound city, Trybe Tv and Spice Tv on the shows, On The Couch, Project Swan, You’ve Got Issues and a few others.  

In 2018, Chinonso enrolled in the School of Media studies, at the Pan Atlantic University, where she studied the Business of Film Making for film producers. She had a big break in 2020, when she played a lead role in Mary Remmy Njoku's feature film production, Beyond Pardon. She has since featured in several notable films and television series, including, NDANI TV's Rumour Has It, My Flatmates, Crazy Grannies, Lockdown, Loving Amanda, Survivors and others.

In 2018, she began hosting the Filmhouse TV Show and was later unveiled as the host of the popular cooking show, Urban Kitchen, which she hosted for two seasons.

In April 2022, Chinonso released her debut film production, I Am Nazzy. The movie was directed by Kayode Peters and featured notable Nigerian actors including, Jimmy Odukoya, Denrele Edun and IK Ogbonna.

Her performance, as the lead character on Africa Magic TV's original series, Sisi Eko received commendation from fans and critics.

Personal life
Chinonso was married to Nigerian gospel singer Eric Arubayi in 2014 until his death in 2017. They have a son together named Jayden.

Awards and recognition
In August 2021, she received a nomination for Next-Rated Actress of the Year at the Africa Choice Awards, alongside other nominees from Ghana and South Africa. In February 2023, she received the award for Distinguished Actress of the Year at the Nigerian Women Achievers Awards.

Filmography

Feature films

I am Nazzy 
 Survivors
 Lockdown
Crazy Grannies 
Loving Amanda
Warmth in Despair 
Zizani
Deathly Obsession 
Oches Secret
Beyond Pardon
3 Can Play 
Clandestine Consequences 
Mustapha (ROK Original film)
Friends Only 
3 Brides 
Killing Eva 
Fated to Love
Grim
All We Ever Wanted 
The Real Us
Frozen Smile
3 Brothers
A Lonely Star 
Muntu
Denial
Gifted (ROK Original film)
Fantasy
It’s Complicated 
Keeping Daniella
Oh! No Santa
Love Struck

Tv series
Dilemma
Sisi Eko
Rumour Has it (NDANI TV Original series)
My Flatmates (Africa Magic Original series)

References 

Living people
Nigerian television actresses
Nigerian stage actresses
Nigerian film actresses
21st-century Nigerian actresses
Igbo actresses
1987 births
Actresses from Anambra State
Nigerian television presenters
Nigerian film producers
Actresses from Delta State